The Silver Bridge was an eyebar-chain suspension bridge built in 1928 and named for the color of its aluminum paint. The bridge carried U.S. Route 35 over the Ohio River, connecting Point Pleasant, West Virginia, and Gallipolis, Ohio.

On December 15, 1967, the Silver Bridge collapsed under the weight of rush-hour traffic, resulting in the deaths of 46 people. Two of the victims were never found. Analysis showed that the bridge was carrying much heavier loads than it had been designed for and had been poorly maintained. The collapsed bridge was replaced by the Silver Memorial Bridge, which was completed in 1969.

History of eyebar-chain bridge construction
At the time of the Silver Bridge construction, eyebar bridges had been built for about 100 years. Such bridges had usually been constructed from redundant bar links, using rows of four to six bars, sometimes using several such chains in parallel. An example can be seen in the Clifton Suspension Bridge, designed by Isambard Kingdom Brunel having chain eyebars that are redundant in two dimensions; this early suspension bridge is still in service. Other bridges of similar design include the earlier road bridge over the Menai Strait built by Thomas Telford in 1826; the Széchenyi Chain Bridge in Budapest, built in 1839–1849, destroyed in the closing days of World War II by retreating Germans in 1945, and rebuilt identically by 1949, with redundant chains and hangers; and the Three Sisters, self-anchored suspension bridges of similar design and construction period (from 1924 to 1928) in Pittsburgh.

Silver Bridge structure

Low redundancy, high strength
The eyebars in the Silver Bridge were not redundant, as links were composed of only two bars each, of high-strength steel (more than twice the tensile strength of common mild steel), rather than a thick stack of thinner bars of lower material strength, as is usual for redundancy. With only two bars, the failure of one could impose excessive loading on the second, causing total failure — which would be unlikely if more bars were used. While a low-redundancy chain can be engineered to the design requirements, safety is completely dependent upon correct, high-quality manufacturing, assembly, and maintenance.

In comparison, the Brooklyn Bridge, with wire-cable suspension, was designed with an excess strength factor of six. Wire cables have extremely high levels of redundancy, with the failure of a single wire strand almost unnoticeable. During the Brooklyn Bridge's construction, it was discovered that some rejected steel wire had been used. To compensate for the rejected steel wire already in the cables, 150 more good steel wires per cable were added to bring the total up to 5,434 redundant strands. The designer's son, Washington Roebling,  decided the safety factor may have been reduced, but was far more than sufficient.

Rocker towers
The towers were "rocker" towers (a design common in Europe), which allowed the bridge to respond to various live loads by a slight tipping of the supporting towers, which were parted at the deck level, rather than passing the suspension chain over a lubricated or tipping saddle, or by stressing the towers in bending.  The towers required the chain on both sides for their support; failure of any one link on either side, in any of the three chain spans, would result in the complete failure of the entire bridge.

Design loads
Bumper-to-bumper traffic jams on the bridge were also much more common, occurring several times a day, five days each week, thus causing more stress to the bridge elements.

Wreckage analysis
The bridge failure was due to a defect in a single link, known as eyebar 330, on the north of the Ohio subsidiary chain, the first link below the top of the Ohio tower. A small crack was formed through fretting wear at the bearing, and grew through internal corrosion, a problem known as stress corrosion cracking.

When the lower side of the eyebar failed, all the load was transferred to the other side of the eyebar, which then failed by ductile overload. The joint was then held together only by three eyebars, and another slipped off the pin at the center of the bearing, so the chain was completely severed. A collapse of the entire structure was inevitable since all parts of a suspension bridge are in equilibrium with one another.

The damage to the link would have been difficult to see during inspection of the bridge:

Inspection prior to construction would not have been able to notice the tiny crack ... the only way to detect the fracture would have been to disassemble the eye-bar. The technology used for inspection at the time was not capable of detecting such cracks.

Aftermath
The collapse focused much-needed attention on the condition of older bridges, leading to intensified inspection protocols and numerous eventual replacements. There were only two bridges built to a similar design, one upstream at St. Marys, West Virginia, and the notably longer Hercilio Luz Bridge at Florianópolis, Brazil. The St. Marys bridge was immediately closed to traffic and the bridge was demolished by the state in 1971. A small truss bridge was kept to allow access to an island in the river. The Hi Carpenter Memorial Bridge was later built to replace the demolished bridge. The Hercilio Luz Bridge remained in active service until 1991 to be reopened in 2019 after a restoration and still stands at Florianópolis due to being built to a higher safety factor than the West Virginia bridge. Modern non-destructive testing methods allow some of the older bridges to remain in service where they are located on lightly traveled roads. Most heavily used bridges of this type have been replaced with modern bridges of various types.

The collapse inspired legislation to ensure that older bridges were regularly inspected and maintained; however, aging infrastructure is still a problem in the United States. In 1983, the Mianus River Bridge in Greenwich, Connecticut, collapsed, causing the deaths of three drivers. The I-35W Mississippi River bridge disaster in 2007 resulted in 13 deaths. In early September 2009, the failure of an eyebar in the San Francisco–Oakland Bay Bridge was discovered during a scheduled closure, resulting in an emergency repair to reinforce the failed member.

A memorial was installed in Point Pleasant to commemorate the 46 bridge collapse victims.

A scale model of the original Silver Bridge was on display at the Point Pleasant River Museum. An archive of literature about the bridge was also kept there for public inspection. On the lower ground floor, the museum displayed an eyebar assembly from the original bridge. The museum closed on July 1, 2018, due to significant fire damage. The future of the Silver Bridge exhibit is not known.

Another eyebar example has been erected for public viewing at a small rest area on the Ohio side of the river, along Route 7.

The bridge has been designated as a National Historic Civil Engineering Landmark by the American Society of Civil Engineers as its collapse ultimately led to the creation of the first national bridge inspection program in the Federal-Aid Highway Act of 1968.

Legacy

Reviewing the collapse and subsequent investigation in his 2012 book To Forgive Design: Understanding Failure, engineering historian Henry Petroski finds it "a cautionary tale for engineers of every kind." As a result of the thoroughness of the investigation, the cause of the disaster was precisely and indisputably found to be "a design that inadvertently made inspection all but impossible and failure all but inevitable. If ever a design was to blame for a failure, this was it."

Petroski does not fault the bridge's designers, who were unaware of many of these hazards. Instead, he points to the future. "If there is anything positive about the Silver Bridge failure," he concludes, "it is that its legacy should be to remind engineers to proceed always with the utmost caution, ever mindful of the possible existence of unknown unknowns and the potential consequences of even the smallest design decisions."

In popular culture
In his 1970 book Operation Trojan Horse, and in his 1975 book The Mothman Prophecies, Fortean author John Keel linked the Silver Bridge collapse to alleged sightings of the Mothman. The story was adapted as a film by the same name, released in 2002.

Author Jack Matthews wrote a novella, Beyond the Bridge, written as the diary of an imaginary survivor of the disaster starting a new life as a dishwasher in a tiny West Virginia town.

Honky tonk singer-songwriter and West Virginia native Ray Anderson released "The Silver Bridge Disaster" as the A-side of a 1967 single.

Silver Memorial Bridge

The Silver Memorial Bridge is a cantilever bridge that spans the Ohio River between Gallipolis, Ohio, and Henderson, West Virginia. The bridge was completed in 1969 as a replacement for the collapsed Silver Bridge, although it is located about 1 mile (1.6 km) downstream (south) of the original.

The bridge carries US 35 across the river and serves as a major crossing for people and goods traveling between Charleston, West Virginia, and Southern and Central Ohio. The speed limit on the bridge is 65 mph (105 km/h). No toll is imposed at either end.

See also
 List of crossings of the Ohio River
 List of bridge failures

References

Further reading

External links 
 Silver Memorial Bridge at Bridges & Tunnels.
West Virginia Division of Culture and History "On This Day" provides a link to the official state disaster video the next day, archive 1.6 MB wmv file having good quality, no sound: http://www.wvculture.org/history/av/silverbridge256.wmv
Bridge collapse video to show sequence of events
Case study of bridge collapse
Video concerning collapse includes comparison of Silver Bridge and earlier eyebar chain suspension bridges using lower strength materials
"The Collapse of the Silver Bridge: National Bureau of Standards Determines Cause" at National Institute of Standards and Technology Virtual Museum

Cantilever bridges in the United States
Road bridges in West Virginia
Monuments and memorials in Ohio
Monuments and memorials in West Virginia
Bridges completed in 1969
Bridges over the Ohio River
Buildings and structures in Mason County, West Virginia
Transportation in Mason County, West Virginia
Road bridges in Ohio
Chain bridges
U.S. Route 35
Bridges of the United States Numbered Highway System
1969 establishments in West Virginia
1969 establishments in Ohio
Bridge disasters in the United States
Bridge disasters caused by engineering error
Bridge disasters caused by maintenance error
Suspension bridges in West Virginia
Suspension bridges in Ohio
Bridges completed in 1928
Transportation disasters in Ohio
Transportation disasters in West Virginia
Buildings and structures in Gallia County, Ohio
Transport disasters in 1967
1967 disasters in the United States
1967 in Ohio
1967 in West Virginia
Former road bridges in the United States
Point Pleasant, West Virginia
Steel bridges in the United States
1928 establishments in Ohio
1928 establishments in West Virginia
1967 disestablishments in Ohio
1967 disestablishments in West Virginia
Interstate vehicle bridges in the United States
Historic Civil Engineering Landmarks